Americans in Costa Rica consists of immigrants and expatriates from the United States to Costa Rica, mostly retirees. According to the U.S. State Department, about 70,000 Americans live in the country.

American retirees, many of whom are Baby boomers, flocked to Costa Rica’s tropical beaches to retire as they’re drawn to its biodiversity, the political stability, and its relative low cost health care. The number of Americans who collect their Social Security checks in Costa Rica has jumped 67% since 2002.

Many Americans have also purchased vacation homes rather than moving lock, stock and barrel, leaving the U.S. behind. They intend to retire in Costa Rica in five years or so and are using the rental income to pay off the property in the interim.

Education
 The American International School of Costa Rica serves American families in Costa Rica.
 The Tico Lingo Spanish School in Heredia teaches the Spanish language to Americans traveling and living in Costa Rica.

See also
 Costa Rican American
 Costa Rica–United States relations

References

Costa Rica
 
 
 
Americans
Costa Rica–United States relations